Inzaghi Donígio (born 25 April 1985), known as Inzaghi, is a former Bissau-Guinean footballer who played as a forward.

Football career
Inzaghi was born in Bissau. After solid displays still in his teens at C.F. União de Lamas – the club was at the time in the second division – he signed with country giants S.L. Benfica in January 2006, after beginning the season at A.D. Ovarense also in the second level.

Inzaghi never appeared officially for the first team, being loaned to PFC Cherno More Varna the following month and reaching the final of the Bulgarian Cup in his first year. From January 2007 to June 2008 he would serve two loans, the first one at Vitória de Setúbal, making his Primeira Liga debut on 25 February 2007 as he started in a 1–1 home draw against C.D. Nacional and playing in a further six matches as a substitute.

Released from Benfica in the summer of 2008, Inzaghi resumed his career in the lower leagues of Portugal. After an unassuming spell in the Albanian Superliga, he retired at the age of only 28 due to recurrent knee injuries.

References

External links

1985 births
Living people
Sportspeople from Bissau
Bissau-Guinean footballers
Association football forwards
Primeira Liga players
Liga Portugal 2 players
Segunda Divisão players
C.F. União de Lamas players
A.D. Ovarense players
S.L. Benfica footballers
Vitória F.C. players
G.D. Chaves players
A.D. Sanjoanense players
First Professional Football League (Bulgaria) players
PFC Cherno More Varna players
PFC Minyor Pernik players
Kategoria Superiore players
FK Kukësi players
Bissau-Guinean expatriate footballers
Expatriate footballers in Portugal
Expatriate footballers in Bulgaria
Expatriate footballers in Albania
Bissau-Guinean expatriate sportspeople in Portugal
Bissau-Guinean expatriate sportspeople in Bulgaria
G.D. Peniche players